Moons and Mushrooms is the seventh studio album by the gothic metal band Lake of Tears. It was released in 2007, and was the first Lake of Tears recording to feature Magnus Sahlgren as an official member of the band (although he had played guitar with Lake of Tears as a guest artist since 1999). Unlike the band's previous two albums, Moons and Mushrooms made heavy use of guitars, having a less electronic sound. A limited edition digipack version of the album was released alongside the standard version, featuring a cover of the Status Quo song "Is There a Better Way?" as a bonus track.

Track listing 
All songs written by Lake of Tears, except "Head on Phantom", written by Christian Silver and Lake of Tears, and "Is There a Better Way" by Francis Rossi and Alan Lancaster.

Personnel 
 Daniel Brennare - vocals, guitar
 Mikael Larsson - bass
 Johan Oudhuis - drums
 Magnus Sahlgren - lead guitar

Additional personnel 

Andreas Olavi - guitars
Dan Helgeson - organ, keyboards
Christian Silver - producer, engineering
Felipe Machado Franco - cover art, artwork
Fredrik Olsson - photography
Anton Hedberg - photography
Johan Örnborg - engineering

2007 albums
Lake of Tears albums